The Chess World Cup 2017 was a 128-player single-elimination chess tournament, held in Tbilisi, Georgia, from 2 to 27 September 2017. It was won by Armenian grandmaster Levon Aronian. This was the second time he had won the Chess World Cup, 12 years after his first win in 2005. It was the 7th edition of the Chess World Cup.

The top two finishers in the tournament, Aronian and Ding Liren, qualified for the Candidates Tournament 2018 for the World Chess Championship 2018.

Bidding process
At the 85th FIDE Congress held during the 41st Chess Olympiad, FIDE received bids to host the World Cup 2017 and 2018 Olympiad from the national federations of Georgia and South Africa. South Africa proposed Sun City and Durban as venues, while Georgia proposed Tbilisi and Batumi respectively. Although Garry Kasparov expressed support for the South African bid during his FIDE presidential campaign, Georgia's bid won, receiving 93 votes to South Africa's 58.

Format
The tournament was a knock-out format, with the exception that there was a provision for the two semi-final losers to play off for third place if necessary (see #Candidates qualification).

Matches consist of two regular time limit games (except for the final, and playoff for third if required, which consist of four regular time limit games). For these two games, players have 90 minutes for the first 40 moves followed by 30 minutes for the rest of the game, with an increment of 30 seconds per move from the start of the game.

If a match is tied after the regular games, tie breaks will be played the next day. The format for the tie breaks is as follows:
 Two rapid games (25 minutes plus 10 seconds increment).
 If the score is tied after two rapid games, further two rapid games (10 minutes plus 10 seconds increment) are played.
 If the score is tied after four rapid games, the opponents play two blitz games (five minutes plus three seconds increment).
 If the score is tied after a pair of blitz games, an armageddon game (in which a draw counts as a win for Black) is played. White has 5 minutes and Black has 4 minutes, with an increment of 3 seconds/move starting from move 61.

Candidates qualification

The tournament qualified two players for the 2018 Candidates Tournament.

However Magnus Carlsen (world champion) and Sergey Karjakin (already seeded to the Candidates) had no need for qualification, and both participated in the tournament (even though it is highly unusual for the defending champion to do so). So the rules were actually that the top two finishers other than Carlsen and Karjakin would qualify for the Candidates. This meant there was provision for a match for third place, between the two semi-final losers, if necessary.

As it turned out, both Carlsen and Karjakin were eliminated in the first three rounds, so the two Candidates qualifiers were simply the two finalists: Armenia's Levon Aronian and China's Ding Liren.

Schedule

Each of the first six rounds takes three days: one day each for the two regular time limit games, then a third day for tie breaks, if required. The final round has four days of regular time limit games, then a fifth day for tie breaks, if required.
 Round 1: September 3–5
 Round 2: September 6–8
 Round 3: September 9–11
 Round 4: September 12–14
 Round 5: September 15–17
 Rest day: September 18
 Round 6: September 19–21
 Rest day: September 22
 Final (and play-off for third place if required): September 23–27

All rounds begin at 15:00 local time (11:00 UTC).

Prize money

According to the regulations, all players have to pay their own expenses for travel, and 20% of each player's prize money goes to FIDE.

Participants
The participants are seeded by their FIDE rating of August 2017. All players are grandmasters unless indicated otherwise.

 , 2822  (World Champion)
 , 2810 (R)
 , 2807 (R)
 , 2803 (R)
 , 2799 (R)
 , 2797 (R)
 , 2792 (R)
 , 2789 (R)
 , 2783 (R)
 , 2783 (R)
 , 2777 (R)
 , 2773 (WC)
 , 2772 (WC)
 , 2753 (AS16)
 , 2751 (R)
 , 2751 (WC)
 , 2745 (E16)
 , 2744 (R)
 , 2744 (R)
 , 2743 (R)
 , 2742 (ON)
 , 2739 (AS16)
 , 2738 (R)
 , 2737 (E16)
 , 2734 (WC)
 , 2731 (E17)
 , 2729 (R)
 , 2728 (E17)
 , 2728 (ACP)
 , 2724 (E16)
 , 2717 (E16)
 , 2715 (E17)
 , 2710 (AS17)
 , 2710 (R)
 , 2707 (E16)
 , 2707 (E17)
 , 2706 (R)
 , 2702 (AS17)
 , 2702 (E16)
 , 2702 (E17)
 , 2696 (E16)
 , 2695 (E17)
 , 2693 (AS17)
 , 2692 (E17)
 , 2692 (PN)
 , 2687 (E16)
 , 2687 (E16)
 , 2682 (Z2.1)
 , 2680 (AF)
 , 2677 (PN)
 , 2675 (R)
 , 2675 (E17)
 , 2666 (E16)
 , 2665 (E17)
 , 2662 (Z2.1)
 , 2660 (E17)
 , 2654 (E17)
 , 2654 (E16)
 , 2652 (E17)
 , 2652 (PN)
 , 2652 (E17)
 , 2650 (E16)
 , 2650 (Z2.5)
 , 2648 (E16)
 , 2648 (AM17)
 , 2646 (E17)
 , 2646 (E17)
 , 2645 (E16)
 , 2644 (E16)
 , 2644 (E16)
 , 2643 (AM17)
 , 2642 (E17)
 , 2641 (Z2.4)
 , 2641 (AM16)
 , 2640 (E16)
 , 2640 (E17)
 , 2633 (J16)
 , 2629 (AM16)
 , 2629 (Z3.3)
 , 2628 (E17)
 , 2627 (Z2.1)
 , 2627 (E16)
 , 2620 (AM17)
 , 2618 (AS16)
 , 2615 (E17)
 , 2614 (AM17)
 , 2606 (E16)
 , 2596 (E17)
 , 2591 (E16)
 , 2590 (ON)
 , 2589 (AS16)
 , 2586 (E16)
 , 2585 (ON)
 , 2580 (E17)
 , 2580 (J15)
 , 2580 (AM16)
 , 2579 (AM17)
 , 2579 (Z3.7)
 , 2577 (PN)
 , 2576 (AS16)
 , 2575 (AS17)
 , 2573 (E16)
 , 2573 (AM17)
 , 2565 (AM16)
 , 2556 (N)
 , 2555 (AS17)
 , 2551 (E17)
 , 2545 (PN)
 , 2543 (Z2.3)
 , 2537 (Z2.5)
 , 2533 (Z3.1)
 , 2531 (Z2.4)
 , 2529 (Z3.4)
 , 2525 (E16)
 , 2522 (Z2.2)
 , 2519 (ON)
 , 2508 (Z3.6)
 , 2487 (Z4.1)
 , 2478 (Z3.3)
 , 2455 (Z4.2)
 , 2455 (Z3.4)
 , 2454 (Z3.2)
 , 2451 (Z3.5)
 , 2449 (AF)
 , 2427 (Z3.5)
 , 2398 (Z4.3)
 , 2377 (Z2.3)
 , 2255 (Z4.4)

Qualification paths 

World Champion (1)
WC: Semi-finalists of the Chess World Cup 2015 (4)
J15 and J16: World Junior Champions 2015 and 2016 (2)
R: Rating (average of all published ratings from February 2016 to January 2017 is used) (19)
E16 and E17: European Individual Championships 2016 (23) and 2017 (22)
AM16 and AM17: American Continental Championships 2016 (4) and 2017 (6)
AS16 and AS17: Asian Chess Championships 2016 (5) and 2017 (5)
AF: African Chess Championship 2017 (2)
Nordic Chess Championship (N), Z2.1 (3), Z2.2 (1), Z2.3 (2), Z2.4 (2), Z2.5 (2), Z3.1 (1), Z3.2 (1), Z3.3 (2), Z3.4 (2), Z3.5 (2), Z3.6 (1), Z3.7 (1), Z4.1 (1), Z4.2 (1), Z4.3 (1), Z4.4 (1): Zonal tournaments
 ACP: highest-placed participant of the ACP Tour who has not qualified with the previous criteria (1)
PN: FIDE President nominee (5)
ON: Organizer nominee (4)

Results, rounds 1–4

Section 1

Section 2

Section 3

Section 4

Section 5

Section 6

Section 7

Section 8

Results, rounds 5–7

Finals

Dress code controversy

Shortly before the third-round game between Anton Kovalyov and Maxim Rodshtein was due to start, Kovalyov was questioned by the arbiter about the knee-length Bermuda shorts he was wearing, the same pair he wore in the first two rounds. Tournament organizer Zurab Azmaiparashvili then approached Kovalyov, stating that his attire violated the FIDE dress code and that he would be punished financially if he did not change what he was wearing. Kovalyov explained that he also wore shorts in the 2015 World Cup without incident, but Azmaiparashvili objected and said that Kovalyov's clothing made him "look like a gypsy." Kovalyov interpreted this as a racial slur. Kovalyov then left the tournament hall and did not return, thus forfeiting the game. He also checked out of his hotel and booked a flight for Dallas, where he is studying for a master's degree in Computer Science technology at the University of Texas. The Chess Federation of Canada filed a formal complaint about the incident. FIDE issued a report on the incident on October 1.

Notes

References

External links
Official website
Pairings tree (PDF). FIDE, August 2017

2017
World Cup
World Cup
2017 in Georgian sport
International sports competitions hosted by Georgia (country)
Sports competitions in Tbilisi
2010s in Tbilisi
September 2017 sports events in Europe
Clothing controversies